Claudia Mitchell (born 1980) is a former US Marine whose left arm was amputated near the shoulder following a motorcycle crash in 2004. She became the first woman to be outfitted with a bionic arm. The arm is controlled through muscles in her chest and side, which in turn are controlled by the nerves that had previously controlled her real arm. The nerves were rerouted to these muscles in a process of targeted reinnervation.

Her prosthesis, a prototype developed by the Rehabilitation Institute of Chicago was one of the most advanced prosthetic arms developed to date.

References

External links

 New Yorker article about Mitchell and the prosthetic procedure
 Video of Mitchell demonstrating the prosthetic on youtube from New Scientist magazine

1980 births
American amputees
Cyborgs
Living people
United States Marines
Female United States Marine Corps personnel
Place of birth missing (living people)
21st-century American women